90 Days is a video news magazine produced by McDonnell Douglas in St. Louis, MO and distributed at the end of every business quarter (hence the show's title) through the mail to employees and shareholders of the company in VHS format. From its inception in September 1989 until the final episode in 1996 under the "90 Days" title, the program routinely featured segments about employees and company programs or products, all while incorporating a review of financial results from the previous quarter. An example clip from the program can currently be found on the video website YouTube. It was "a video report about issues, events and people important to you and McDonnell Douglas."

Overview 
As Mr. McDonnell explains in "Number 1," the purpose behind going to the expense of producing and distributing 90 Days was to facilitate better communication between the company and its employees and shareholders. In fact, the first episode came with a postcard so viewers could share their comments on the show, and a special mailing address was established for comments throughout the life of the program. When "Number 1" debuted, the company was in the midst of a major transition, and at the time this was an innovative form of communication that served as an insight into the company's direction.

Hosts 
Over the course of the program's production, 90 Days had three hosts:
John McDonnell (episodes 1-17)
Harry Stonecipher (episodes 18-25)
Guest host (episode 26)

Episodes
Each episode of 90 Days was named according to its numerical order in the series, and featured a summary of that episode either on the reverse of the VHS video cover (early episodes) or printed on a label on the video itself (episodes after "Number 17").

Legacy of 90 Days 
There are not any known plans to restart 90 Days or its successor, Flight Times TV, by Boeing.

References 

Documentary television series about aviation
McDonnell Douglas
1989 American television series debuts
1996 American television series endings